Granville Ryles (1831 - 1909) was a minister, farmer, and state legislator in Arkansas. In 1883 he represented Pulaski County in the Arkansas House of Representatives.

He was part of the A.M.E. Church. He was an official at the 1880 Arkansas Colored Convention. He was involved in a legal dispute over a farmed land area he leased in former Indian Territory.

See also
African-American officeholders during and following the Reconstruction era

References

African-American state legislators in Arkansas
19th-century American politicians
1831 births
1909 deaths
20th-century African-American people